Agequake: Riding the Demographic Rollercoaster Shaking Business, Finance and our World  is a book written by Paul Wallace and published in 1999, that investigates what possible ramifications are likely as a significant and unprecedented portion of the human population age. The book argues that rising longevity and lower fertility is causing a seismic shift in the profile of populations worldwide, and will be a fundamental force to that will shake business and finance, along with lifestyles and attitudes. Wallace suggests the old bogey of overpopulation is being replaced by a population "implosion".

Through using dependency ratios (the ratio of non-working dependents to the working population) will lead to a point where workers will be burdened with the fiscal and practical responsibilities of supporting a ballooning population of aged retirees.  Society and economy will be affected as the proportion of youth declines - typically the most entrepreneurial, creating and risk taking segment of society.  Along with the liquidation of baby boomer assets to pay for their retirements, this is likely to halt economic growth in the future, and  economic stagnation may be a more likely prospect.  Housing prices will plummet, and the world may experience the greatest bear market in history.

Internationally the relationship between youthful and aggressive developing world and the rich older Organisation for Economic Co-operation and Development (OECD) countries (where elderly women will become an influential constituency) will change.

See also
 Generational accounting

References

External links
 Paul Wallace Profile

Ageing
1999 non-fiction books
Economics books
Demographic economic problems
English-language books